Songoyah is a town and sub-prefecture in the Faranah Prefecture in the Faranah Region of Guinea. As of 2014 it had a population of 13,422 people.

References

Sub-prefectures of the Faranah Region